Lego Masters Sweden (Lego Masters Sverige) is a Swedish competition show where the contestants each week gets a new task of building with lego. The season started airing on 25 October 2020 on TV4. Presenter is Mauri Hermundsson, with Magnus Göransson as judge. Rhys Bjorn Hayes finished the series as runner up. He lost the final after his Lego sculpture collapsed when the time limit ran out.

References

External links 
 
 

2020 Swedish television seasons